WCXQ-LP (98.1 FM, Top 98.1) is a radio station broadcasting a CHR format. Licensed to Isabela-Camuy, Puerto Rico, the station serves the northern and western Puerto Rico area. The station is currently owned by Community Action Corporation.

External links

CXQ-LP
Radio stations established in 2014
2014 establishments in Puerto Rico
Isabela, Puerto Rico
Camuy, Puerto Rico